Max Huber is a former Grey Cup champion offensive lineman who played ten seasons in the Canadian Football League, winning the Grey Cup Championship with the Montreal Alouettes.

A graduate of Brigham Young University, Huber started his career with the Edmonton Eskimos and then went on to 4 seasons with the BC Lions, playing 45 regular season games. After a half season with the Hamilton Tigercats and 6 with the Calgary Stampeders, he finished playing 10 games with the Montreal Alouettes.

External links
 College Football Bio
 Fanbase Bio

1945 births
Sportspeople from Mesa, Arizona
Players of American football from Arizona
Canadian football offensive linemen
BYU Cougars football players
Living people
Montreal Alouettes players
BC Lions players
Edmonton Elks players
Hamilton Tiger-Cats players
Calgary Stampeders players
American players of Canadian football